Sinatra Saga, Vol. 2 is a 1994 live album by American singer Frank Sinatra.

Track listing
"I Sing the Songs (I Write the Songs)" (Bruce Johnston) - 3:20
Recorded at the Westchester Premiere Theater, Tarrytown, New York, September 27, 1976
"The Best Is Yet To Come" (Cy Coleman, Carolyn Leigh) - 3:35
"Come Rain or Come Shine" (Harold Arlen, Johnny Mercer) - 3:25
Recorded at the Metropolitan Center, Boston, Massachusetts, June 7, 1981
"Change Partners" (Irving Berlin) - 3:04
Recorded at the Lloyd Norble Center, Norman, Oklahoma, January 23, 1986
"I Can't Get Started" (Vernon Duke, Ira Gershwin) - 4:11
Recorded at the Resorts International, Atlantic City, New Jersey, November 24, 1979
"For Once in My Life" (Ron Miller, Orlando Murden) - 2:56
Recorded at the Westchester Premiere Theater, Tarrytown, New York, September 26, 1976
"I See Your Face Before Me" (Howard Dietz, Arthur Schwartz) - 2:30
Recorded at the Royal Albert Hall, London, England, May 29, 1975
"Just the Way You Are" (Billy Joel) - 3:21
Recorded at the Resorts International, Atlantic City, New Jersey, November 21, 1979
"See the Show Again" (Barry Manilow) - 3:35
Recorded at The Tonight Show, Burbank, California, November 14, 1977
"It's All Right with Me" (Cole Porter) - 2:58
Recorded at the Lloyd Norble Center, Norman, Oklahoma, January 23, 1986
"For the Good Times" (Kris Kristofferson) - 5:09
Recorded at the Resorts International, Atlantic City, New Jersey, November 25, 1979
"Pennies from Heaven" (Johnny Burke, Arthur Johnston) - 4:15
Recorded at the Century Plaza Hotel, Los Angeles, California, May 19, 1981
"Empty Tables" (Mercer, Jimmy Van Heusen) - 4:38
"Never Gonna Fall in Love Again" (Eric Carmen) - 3:23
Recorded at the Westchester Premiere Theater, Tarrytown, New York, September 26, 1976
"The Song Is You" (Jerome Kern, Oscar Hammerstein II) - 3:14
Recorded at the Resorts International, Atlantic City, New Jersey, November 21, 1979
"Angel Eyes" (Matt Dennis, Earl Brent) - 3:28
Recorded at the Metropolitan Center, Boston, Massachusetts, June 7, 1981
"They All Laughed" (George Gershwin, I. Gershwin) - 2:19
Recorded at the Resorts International, Atlantic City, New Jersey, November 19, 1979
"You and Me (We Wanted It All)" (Peter Allen, Carole Bayer Sager) - 3:49
Recorded at the Metropolitan Center, Boston, Massachusetts, June 7, 1981
"Here's to the Band" (Artie Schroeck, Sharman Howe, Alfred Nittoli) - 4:27
Recorded at the Lloyd Norble Center, Norman, Oklahoma, January 23, 1986
"My Way" (Paul Anka, Claude Francois, Jacques Revaux, Gilles Thibaut) - 5:24
Recorded at the Resorts International, Atlantic City, New Jersey, November 19, 1979

1994 live albums
Frank Sinatra live albums